Thomas Hugh Willingham (May 30, 1906 – June 15, 1988) was an infielder in Major League Baseball. He played for the Chicago White Sox and Philadelphia Phillies.

References

External links

Major League Baseball infielders
Chicago White Sox players
Philadelphia Phillies players
Chicago White Sox scouts
Minor league baseball managers
Ardmore Indians players
Borger Gassers players
Dallas Steers players
Fort Smith Giants players
Hollywood Stars players
Kansas City Blues (baseball) players
Los Angeles Angels (minor league) players
Newark Bears (IL) players
Odessa Oilers players
Oklahoma City Indians players
Seminole Oilers players
Sioux City Cowboys players
1906 births
1988 deaths
Baseball players from Texas